Charles Lawson of Borthwick Hall (1795–1873) was a Scottish nurseryman and merchant, noted for the introduction of foreign crops into the United Kingdom. He served as Lord Provost of Edinburgh from 1862 to 1865.

Life
He was born in Edinburgh, son of the seed merchant Peter Lawson and his wife Patricia Grant. The family live at 19 Blair Street, a street joining the Royal Mile to the Cowgate.

He was educated at Edinburgh High School and Edinburgh University. His father died in 1821, and Charles then took over the family business Peter Lawson & Son.

In Edinburgh he lived at 35 George Square. In 1851 he purchased Borthwick Hall near Gorebridge in Midlothian.

He was connected to the huge Lawson-Donaldson Seed Warehouse off the Shore in Leith.

Successful on a national scale, Lawson became a specialist in grass seeds and conifers. The Cupressus lawsoniana was named after him.
Went spectacularly bankrupt  by 1873 after unwise investment in guano from San Domingo. [1]

Artistic recognition

He was portrayed in office by John Graham Gilbert.

Notes

1795 births
1873 deaths
Nurserymen
Businesspeople from Edinburgh
Lord Provosts of Edinburgh
19th-century Scottish businesspeople
People educated at the Royal High School, Edinburgh
Alumni of the University of Edinburgh